The Staircase is a 1950 West German drama film directed by Alfred Braun and (uncredited) Wolfgang Staudte, and starring Hilde Körber, Herbert Stass and Paul Westermeier. It was partly shot at the Wiesbaden Studios in Hesse. The film's sets were designed by the art directors Paul Markwitz and Fritz Maurischat.

Synopsis
The film portrays the lives of the inhabitants of the four floors of a tenement building, connected by the staircase.

Cast

References

Bibliography 
 Hans-Michael Bock and Tim Bergfelder. The Concise Cinegraph: An Encyclopedia of German Cinema. Berghahn Books, 2009.

External links 
 

1950 films
1950 drama films
German drama films
West German films
1950s German-language films
Films directed by Wolfgang Staudte
Films directed by Alfred Braun
German black-and-white films
1950s German films